Yrr or YRR may refer to:
 a music label founded by Yuna (singer)
 a fictional alien species in The Swarm (Schätzing novel)
 Young, Restless and Reformed – a Christian organization